Dutch Ceylon was a governorate established in present-day Sri Lanka by the Dutch East India Company. Although the Dutch managed to capture most of the coastal areas in Sri Lanka, they were never able to control the Kandyan Kingdom located in the interior of the island. Dutch Ceylon existed from 1640 until 1796.

In the early 17th century, Sri Lanka was partly ruled by the Portuguese and Sri Lankan kingdoms, who were constantly battling each other. Although the Portuguese were not winning the war, their rule was rather burdensome to the people of those areas controlled by them. While the Portuguese were engaged in a long war of independence from Spanish rule, the Sinhalese king (the king of Kandy) invited the Dutch to help defeat the Portuguese. The Dutch interest in Ceylon was to have a united battle front against the Iberians at that time.

History

Background

The Portuguese
The Dutch were invited by the Sinhalese to help fight the Portuguese. They signed the Kandyan Treaty of 1638 with Rajasinghe II and soon embarked on a war against their common enemy. As such the Dutch were appointed as a protector of the country.

Meanwhile, however, Rajasinghe II approached the French and offered them the Trincomalee fort as a check against Dutch power. The Dutch captured Trinco from the French and controlled all the maritime provinces of the island. Rajasinghe and the Dutch were both playing a double game trying to outwit each other, and the treaty of 1638 was never implemented. The Dutch ruled all the Tamil provinces and brought Tanjore Tamil slaves to work in the cinnamon gardens in the Western Province and tobacco farms in Jaffna. The capital of Dutch Coromandel was in Pulicat and they brought needed manpower from the Indian colonies.

The Dutch and Portuguese
Portuguese rule was always in the maritime provinces and the people whom they converted were the coastal folk. They were the backbone of their power. Many of the princes they converted had either died or were no longer Catholic. The rest of Ceylon remained in the Buddhist majority and Hindu religions.

The Dutch were used by the Sinhalese king to take revenge on the Portuguese who wanted to expand their rule. The coming of the Dutch ensured that the Portuguese had two enemies to deal with so finally the Portuguese were forced to sign a treaty with the Dutch and come to terms with their open economies. Finally, the Portuguese left Ceylon.

Portugal was at war with its ruler, the King of Spain. Once Portugal obtained its freedom from Spain in 1640, the Netherlands settled for peace with Portugal. Then they divided the occupied areas of Ceylon amicably under a treaty signed in Goa. Slowly, the Dutch became the rulers of coastal and outer areas of Ceylon and Indonesia, and the Portuguese were left with smaller pieces of territory than those of the Dutch and the English.

Dutch–Portuguese War
From the time that Christopher Columbus landed in America, there was a significant Iberian challenge facing large parts of the world for Spain and Portugal in conquering the Americas and many other territories around the world. In the east, Portugal held territories not only in Ceylon but in India, in the Persian Gulf, and what is now Indonesia, then referred to as the East Indies.

From 1580 to 1640, the throne of Portugal was held by the Habsburg kings of Spain resulting in the biggest colonial empire until then (see Iberian Union). In 1583 Philip I of Portugal, II of Spain, sent his combined Iberian fleet to clear the French traders from the Azores, decisively hanging his prisoners-of-war from the yardarms and contributing to the "Black Legend". The Azores were the last part of Portugal to resist Philip's reign over Portugal.

The Netherlands meanwhile were in open revolt against their Habsburg overlord and declared themselves a Republic in 1581. Prior to 1580 Dutch merchants had procured colonial produce mostly from Lisbon, but the Iberian Union cut off this supply. Survival of the fledgling republic depended on their going into the colonial business themselves.

With two global empires to rule, and with the growing colonial competition with the Dutch, English and French, the Habsburg kings neglected the protection of some of the Portuguese possessions around the world. In this period Portugal lost a great number of lands to the new colonial rivals.

During the Twelve Years' Truce (1609–21) the Dutch made their navy a priority in order to devastate Spanish maritime trade — upon which much of Spain's economy depended — after the resumption of war. In 1627, the Castilian economy collapsed. Even with a number of victories, Spanish resources were now fully stretched across Europe and also at sea protecting their vital shipping against the greatly improved Dutch fleet. Spain's enemies, such as the Netherlands and England, coveted its overseas wealth, and in many cases found it easier to attack poorly-defended Portuguese outposts than Spanish ones. The Spanish were simply no longer able to cope with naval threats. In the Dutch–Portuguese War that followed many erstwhile Portuguese possession fell into Dutch hands.

Between 1638 and 1640 the Netherlands even came to control part of Brazil's northeast region, with their capital in Recife. The Portuguese won a significant victory in the Second Battle of Guararapes in 1649. By 1654, the Netherlands had surrendered and returned control of all Brazilian land to the Portuguese.

Although Dutch colonies in Brazil were wiped out, during the course of the 17th century the Dutch were able to occupy Ceylon, the Cape of Good Hope, and the East Indies, and to take over the trade with Japan at Nagasaki. Portugal's Asiatic territories were reduced to bases at Portuguese Macau, Portuguese Timor and Portuguese India.

Admiral van Spilbergen

In the year 1602, on 2 May, the Dutch Admiral Joris van Spilbergen arrived in Ceylon with three ships from the Dutch port of Veere after a 12-month voyage. Visiting Kandy, the seat of King Vimaladharmasuriya I, Spilbergen and the King developed cordial relations. The King's admiration for his new-found friend was so deep that he began to learn the Dutch language saying ‘Kandy is now Flanders’. They discussed future relations, focussing on possible Dutch military assistance to expel the Portuguese from the coastal areas as well as the trade in cinnamon and pepper. As a token of his friendship, the Dutch Admiral left in the King's service two versatile and skilled musicians: Erasmus Matsberger and Hans Rempel.

Second fleet and the massacre at Batticaloa Beach
Shortly after the successful visit of Van Spilbergen, a second Dutch fleet under the command of Sebalt de Weert arrived on the island. De Weert was a very skilful commander who discovered the Falkland Islands during the attempt by Dutch Admirals Cordes and Mahu to find an alternative route to the East Indies through Cape Horn in 1598. After an initial agreement with the king of Kandy, he returned in 1603 to Batticaloa with a fleet of six ships to take part in a joint effort to oust the Portuguese from the island. During his stay, he took four passing Portuguese ships but released the Portuguese crews who had surrendered to the Dutch on the promise of a quarter. The King was very angered by this action and after a perceived insult to his wife, he ordered his men to kill De Weert and 50 of his unarmed compatriots.

First victory at Batticaloa

After this unhappy event, the Dutch concentrated on organising their trade with the East Indian spice islands. It took more than three decades before the Dutch again undertook action to expel the Portuguese who had arrived some 150 years earlier and were firmly established on the island. After many bloody wars with the Portuguese, King Rajasingha II became convinced that lasting peace with the Portuguese was not possible and he invited the Dutch to force them off the island. At that time the Dutch were still at war with Portugal, which was in a personal union with Spain. The Dutch Council of the Indies in Batavia (Dutch East India) complied with this request and in 1637 sent four ships to the island under Captain Jan Thijssen Payart who signed a treaty with the King. On 4 January 1638 a decisive sea engagement took place off the coast of Goa between Portuguese and Dutch naval forces. The Portuguese fleet was decimated following this battle and the victorious Dutch Admiral Adam Westerwolt (1580–1639) decided to attack the Portuguese fort at Batticaloa on Ceylon with a fleet of five ships and 800 men. In coalition with strong Singhalese forces, he conquered the fort on 18 May 1638.

Five days later, following this victorious conquest, Westerwolt in the name of the States General, Prince Frederik Hendrik and the Dutch East India Company agreed to a new Treaty with King Rajasingha in his Palace in Batticaloa. The Treaty was a landmark and set the tone for future relations between the Kandyan Kings and the Dutch. Under the Treaty the Dutch were to have a monopoly over all trades except elephants. The forts captured from the Portuguese would be garrisoned by the Dutch or demolished, as the King thought fit. The crucial clause ‘as the King thought fit’ was however only included in the Sinhala and not in the Dutch text of the Treaty. This later gave rise to much disagreement between the two parties. The same goes for the clause stating that the King would pay any expenses incurred by the Dutch in the war effort against the Portuguese.

Slowly but surely, the Dutch land and naval forces continued to oust the Portuguese from parts of Ceylon. In February 1640, the Portuguese fort of Negombo, a short distance North of Colombo was captured by Philip Lucasz. Following his sudden death, the command was devolved to the capable Willem Jacobsz Coster who earlier fought under Admiral Westerwolt on the east coast. Against overwhelming odds he besieged the strong fort at Galle. After storming the city on 13 March 1640, he became master of it within a few hours. For the next 18 years, Galle would remain the centre of Dutch power in Ceylon.

Dutch Ceylon (1664–1795)
The Portuguese who arrived in Sri Lanka at the beginning of the 16th century were able to establish their power in many areas of the Maritime Provinces of the island. As the Portuguese who captured the Maritime Provinces invaded the Kandyan Kingdom with the intention of conquering that Kingdom too.

Kandyan kings took steps to obtain the assistance of the Dutch in order to expel the Portuguese from this country. About a century after the arrival of the Portuguese, the Dutch too came to Asia in order to obtain trading commodities. The Dutch had established a strong trading company called the United East Indian Company (VOC) in order to implement their trading activities effectively and systematically. This trading company had undertaken trading activities and the expansion of the political power of the Dutch in Asia. Until the arrival of the Dutch in Asia, the Portuguese did not face any threat from the European nation for about a period of century. But with the arrival of the Dutch conflicts began between the two powers in Asia with regard to their commercial interests. In this situation, the Kandyan kings attempted to obtain the assistance of the Dutch to expel the Portuguese from Sri Lanka. By this unit is expected to study the relations between the Kandyan Kingdom and the Dutch and also the nature of the socio–economic and cultural impact of the Dutch rule.

Establishment of Dutch power in the Maritime Provinces:

 Arrival of the Dutch in the East – 1595 – 96
 Following the disruption of Dutch access to spices, the first Dutch expedition set sail for the East Indies in 1595 to access spices directly from Asia. A capital was established in Batavia (now Jakarta), which became the centre of the VOC's Asian trading network.
 Establishment of the VOC – 1602
 The VOC (in Dutch: Vereenigde Oostindische Compagnie) was established in 1602 as a chartered company, whose goal was to trade with Mughal India, where the majority of Europe's cotton and silk in this period originated from.
 Seeking of Dutch assistances by Kandyan Kings – (arrival of Dutch envoys during the reign of Vimaladharmasuriya I, the attempt made by Senarat to obtain Dutch aid)
 In the early 17th century, Sri Lanka was partly ruled by the Portuguese and Sri Lankan kingdoms, who were constantly battling each other. Although the Portuguese were not winning the war, their rule was rather burdensome to the people of those areas controlled by them. While the Dutch were engaged in a long war of independence from Spanish rule, the Sinhalese king (the king of Kandy) invited the Dutch to help defeat the Portuguese.
 Treaty of 1638 signed between Rajasinghe II and the Dutch

The Kandyan Treaty of 1638 was a treaty between the Kingdom of Kandy and the Dutch Republic signed by King Rajasinghe II for the Kingdom of Kandy and Adam Westerwold and William Jacobsz Coster, a commander and vice commander of the Dutch Naval Forces respectively, for the Dutch East India Company.

Treaty of 1638, main articles of Treaty.

 The Dutch agreed to support the king of Kandy to drive the Portuguese from the country.
 The king agreed to settle by way of providing the Dutch with commodities such as cinnamon, pepper and beeswax the amount that the Dutch would spend on battles against the Portuguese.
 Granting the Dutch the monopoly of collecting commodities from the Kandyan areas except for elephants.
 Agreeing to deploy, if the king wished to do so, the Dutch army at the fortresses that would be captured from the Portuguese.

The Dutch retained an area as compensation for the cost of war and gradually extended their land.

British takeover

The period of Dutch rule over Ceylon would soon come to an end due to changing events in Europe. In 1792, the French Revolutionary Wars broke out between Republican France and a coalition of European nations, which included the Dutch Republic. In 1794, a French invasion force conquered the Dutch Republic, and Prince William V, the Dutch stadtholder fled into exile with his family to Great Britain in order to escape the French. The previous regime was replaced by the French-installed Batavian Republic, which served as a de facto French protectorate. This led to confusion throughout the Dutch colonial empire between which regime to support, that of the deposed statholder in Britain or the Batavian Republic.

A few years prior, Governor Falck had died in 1785 after a short illness. He was succeeded by Willem Jacob van der Graaff, an aggressive Dutch expansionist who attempted to extend the colonial borders well beyond established limits. In 1792, van der Graaff was readying the colony for a war with the Kingdom of Kandy. However, the Dutch East India Company administration in Batavia realised the difficulties such a war would pose given events in Europe and ordered van der Graaff to abandon his war plans. In protest, van der Graaff resigned from his position as Governor and was succeeded by Jan Gerard van Angelbeek, who would serve as the last Dutch Governor of Ceylon.

In 1795, Prince William V issued in February 1795 orders to Johan van Angelbeek to put his forces, forts and warships under British protection. He should consider the British troops ‘… belonging to a power that is in friendship and alliance with their High Mightinesses (the Governors of the VOC), and who come to prevent the Colony from being invaded by the French’. After the war, the British government promised to restore the colony to the Dutch. Van Angelbeek first accepted Prince William's letter and agreed with the British presence on the island.

Later, however, Van Angelbeek and his Political Council took the fateful decision that the Batavian Republic was considered the sovereign of the colonies and their troops should be ordered to resist any British presence on the island. But the Dutch Governor did not realise that British intrigues had already undermined his military capabilities. The defence of Dutch Ceylon was undertaken mainly by European mercenaries, in particular, the De Meuron Regiment: 1,000 men strong and for two-thirds consisting of Swiss soldiers. On 30 March 1795, the British official Hugh Cleghorn signed a contract with the proprietor of the Regiment, Count Charles-Daniel de Meuron to transfer his regiment into British service for the sum of £6,000. After a token resistance, Van Angelbeek gave up. Many Dutch officers and soldiers felt betrayed by their own Governor and at the end of the siege of Colombo turned their heavy guns on the Governor's palace. On 14 February 1796, the Dutch forces surrendered with minimal bloodshed. Pierre-Frederic de Meuron, brother of Count Charles-Daniel, changed his blue Dutch uniform for a red British one and became Military Governor of Ceylon in September 1797 until he was relieved by Frederic North, the first British Governor.

Administration
Dutch Ceylon was administered by a Governor appointed by the Governor General of the Dutch East Indies.

Legacy

Dutch diaspora

Many of the Dutch Burghers migrated to Australia after British rule ended in 1948 to take advantage of the White Australia policy due to their European descent.

Placenames
The islands of the Palk Straits were renamed during Dutch rule in the Dutch language as Kayts, Delft and other cities of the Netherlands. The Dutch priest Philippus Baldeus has written a great historical record similar to Mahavamsa on the Jaffna people and their culture and it was immediately published in Dutch and German with several beautiful pictures. At the Point Pedro Market Square, a granite stone inscription still marks the place where Rev. Baldeus preached to the Tamils under a big tamarind tree. This tamarind tree was uprooted during the cyclone of 1964.

Language
When the Dutch arrived in Ceylon, Portuguese was a recognized language in the occupied areas of the island. It was, however, a Portuguese creole due to its relationship with the native languages.

Although this language is no longer spoken there are Dutch influences found in the Sinhala and Tamil languages. There is also a portion of the Sri Lankan population with Dutch surnames, often people of mixed Dutch and Sri Lankan heritage, who are known as Burghers.

Dutch language policy 
During the 140 years of Dutch control, they pursued an active policy of trying to make Dutch the principal language on the island. This included setting up schools to teach Dutch to local people, although these often suffered from a lack of qualified teachers. However, the Dutch language policy by and large failed. One reason for this was that Portuguese had already become a language of wider communication (LWC) in Ceylon prior to 1656.

Dutch loanwords in Sinhala and Tamil 
When the Dutch language was introduced it also mingled with indigenous and Portuguese influences.

Nevertheless, there are many Dutch loanwords in the two official languages of Ceylon, Sinhala and Tamil. Nicoline van der Sijs reckons that there are some 230 Dutch loanwords in Sinhala. Many of these are in the fields of warfare, trade and agriculture. For example, the Sinhala word for 'potato',  pronounced ,' hospital ' (ඉස්පිරිතාලෙ), ඉස්කුරුප්පුව and ඉස්තෝප්පුව comes from the Dutch. In the modern Sri Lankan Tamil language, there are reckoned to be about 50 Dutch loanwords.

See also
 Kingdom of Jaffna (1215–1624)
 Portuguese Ceylon (1505–1658)
 Kingdom of Kandy (1469–1815)
 British Ceylon (1815–1948)

References

External links
 The Dutch Period in Ceylon 1602–1796
 Wagenaar, Lodewijk “Bred up under Our Roofs”: Domestic Slavery in Ceylon, 1760-1834.

 
1640 establishments in the Dutch Empire
1796 disestablishments
Former countries in South Asia
Former Dutch colonies
Former trading posts of the Dutch East India Company
Former settlements and colonies of the Dutch East India Company
History of Galle
Kingdom of Kandy
Sri Lankan Tamil history
States and territories established in 1640